Kevin Doukouré Grobry (born 30 March 1999) is a  professional footballer who plays as a central midfielder for Liga I side Farul Constanța.

Club career
Doukouré made his debut for Farul Constanța on 17 July 2022, in a 2–1 Liga I win to FC U Craiova 1948.

References

External links
 
 

1999 births
Living people
People from Woroba District
Expatriate footballers in Romania
Ivorian expatriate sportspeople in Romania
Ivorian expatriate footballers
Ivorian footballers
Association football defenders
Liga I players
Slovenian PrvaLiga players
FCV Farul Constanța players
NK Tabor Sežana players